The San Antonio Indians were a minor league baseball team based in San Antonio, Texas, that played from 1929 to 1932 in the Texas League. They played their home games at League Park. Notable players include Ray Grimes, Wilbur Cooper, Sam Leslie, Jack Mealey, Jo-Jo Moore, and Pinky Higgins.

Season records

Source:

See also
 :Category:San Antonio Indians players
 San Antonio Bears (preceding Texas League team)
 San Antonio Missions (succeeding Texas League team)

References

Further reading
 

Sports teams in San Antonio
Defunct Texas League teams
Defunct baseball teams in Texas
Baseball teams established in 1929
Baseball teams disestablished in 1932
1929 establishments in Texas
1932 disestablishments in Texas